= Marion von Klot =

Baltic-German Lutheran martyr

Marion von Klot (1897–1919), was a Latvian (Baltic-German) noblewoman.

She was executed during the Russian Bolshevik occupation in Riga in 1919. She became regarded as an evangelical martyr.
